Albert Puig (born 1 April 1994) is a Spanish swimmer. He competed in the men's 4 × 200 metre freestyle relay event at the 2016 Summer Olympics.

References

External links
 

1994 births
Living people
Olympic swimmers of Spain
Swimmers at the 2016 Summer Olympics
Swimmers at the 2018 Mediterranean Games
Place of birth missing (living people)
Spanish male freestyle swimmers
Mediterranean Games competitors for Spain